The Gesetz über Titel, Orden und Ehrenzeichen ("Law of Titles, Orders and Honours"), often shortened to Ordensgesetz ("Orders Law"), is a federal law of Germany detailing the treatment and handling procedures for civilian and military decorations. The law was put into effect on July 26, 1957, and fulfilled two primary purposes. First, it stipulated how medals and military decorations from before 1945 should be handled (including those from the days of the Weimar Republic, which had been influenced by laws in 1933 and 1937 under the government of Nazi Germany). Second, it was intended to describe treatment and procedures for medals in the (then newly created) Federal Republic of Germany.

Basic Conventions
In general the German law elucidates the following conventions:

 Both the Federal government as well as the States can confer Titles, Orders and Honours (referred to here simply as Orders)
 The Federal President can personally establish Orders or quasi-officially recognize existing Honours (for example in the area of sport).
 Convicted criminals will, as a rule, have Orders and Honours revoked.
 Germans may accept foreign Orders only after presidential approval.
 Awards may only be borne personally by the honoured person; the decorations remain however, as a rule, in the property of the heirs upon death.
 Unauthorized bearing of domestic and foreign Orders and Honours as well as the bearing of Awards with National Socialistic emblems can be considered a breach of civil law and be subject to a fine.

The original law also committed the German federal government to pay Ehrensold (literally "honorary soldier's pay", a type of pension or honorarium) included in certain awards from World War I and before. On February 19, 2006, this portion of the law was nullified.

Previously Conferred Medals
The law outlines numerous stipulations and rulings on regulations for previously conferred medals and military decorations. In practice the law conforms to German criminal code, particularly § 86a, which forbids distribution or public display of Nazi symbolism without historical or academic cause.

Awards from before the Nazi's rise to power in 1933 may be worn so long as they are only worn in their original form. Along with other circumstantial stipulations, medals from 1933 to 1945 may only be worn if National Socialist symbols are removed (swastikas, SS runes, etc.). Medals awarded to members of civil services (e.g. fire departments or search and rescue crews) have no further limitations. Military commendations conferred by a previously allied state may only be worn through expressed consent, regardless the time they were awarded.

Medals specifically permitted for display by the law include:

 The Iron Cross (and its varying grades)
 The Silesian Eagle (an award from the Weimar Republic for the Freikorps)
 The Baltenkreuz (an award from the Weimar Republic for combat in the Baltic states)
 The Wound Badge
 The Luftschutzabzeichen (Air defense badge)
 The Panzer Badge
 The Infantry Assault Badge
 The Close Combat Clasp
 The General Assault Badge

Section 6 paragraph 2 specifically reiterates that medals with National Socialist emblems may not be worn. They may not be produced, offered, inventoried, sold or used in commerce in any form. Accompanying the law, the German Ministry of the Interior released a supplement depicting the altered forms of awards from the period covered by 1934 to 1945.

Order of precedence
Section 12 of the law enumerates the order of precedence for medals worn by soldiers. Medals are worn on the left upper breast with the following precedence from right to left:

 Verdienstorden der Bundesrepublik Deutschland (Order of Merit of the Federal Republic of Germany)
 Rettungsmedaille am Bande (Lifesaving Medal; originally a Prussian award for saving the life of another soldier)
 Eisernes Kreuz 1914 (Iron Cross awarded during the First World War)
 Eisernes Kreuz 1939 (Iron Cross awarded during the Second World War)
 Other medals awarded for service in the First World War in the order of their conferment
 Ehrenkreuz für Frontkämpfer und Kriegsteilnehmer (Cross of Honour for Combatants and Participants in World War 1914-1918) established in 1934, awarded to surviving combatants and participants, as well as the bereaved parents and widows of fallen combatants/participants
 Kriegsverdienstkreuz 1939 (War Merit Cross, a WW2 non-combat medal equivalent to the non-combat version of the pre-WW2 Iron Cross)
 Other medals awarded for service in the Second World War in the order of their conferment
 Further German awards in the order of their conferment
 Officially authorized awards in the order of their conferment
 Foreign awards in the order of their respective precedence

See also
Military decorations of the Third Reich
Strafgesetzbuch § 86a

References

External links
 Full text of the Ordensgesetz [In German]

1957 in law
Military awards and decorations of Germany
Law of Germany